Spanish Renovation (RE) was a Spanish monarchist political party active during the Second Spanish Republic that advocated the restoration of Alfonso XIII of Spain, as opposed to Carlism. Associated with the Acción Española think-tank, the party was led by Antonio Goicoechea and José Calvo Sotelo. In 1937, during the course of the Spanish Civil War, it formally disappeared after Francisco Franco's merger of the variety of far-right organizations in the rebel zone into a single party.

History 

The group was formed in January 1933 after Goicoechea and some followers split from Acción Popular and were given Alfonso's approval to form a new party, although from the outset RE maintained good relations with the Carlists and sought to bring them into various anti-Republican conspiracies. Even before the Civil War RE was linked to the Falange, paying it a 10,000 peseta monthly subsidy. RE espoused a kind of authoritarian statist corporatism, particularly marked after Calvo Sotelo took control of the party.

The group was one of the first amongst those involved in conspiracy against the Popular Front government to endorse Franco as overall leader. RE was also closely linked to the military group Unión Militar Española which played an important role in bringing about civil war. During the opening stages of the civil war RE was close to General Emilio Mola, who consulted regularly with the group's leadership.

The assassination of Calvo Sotelo, who was much more personally popular and a better orator than the generally ineffectual Goicoechea, in July 1936 had weakened RE somewhat and before long they became wholly subservient to Franco in an attempt to retain influence for a group that had little popular support. Along with a variety of other far right groups RE disappeared in April 1937 with the formation of the Falange Española Tradicionalista y de las Juntas de Ofensiva Nacional-Sindicalista. Recognising that his power base was flimsy at best Goicoechea immediately accepted the decree and dissolved RE.

References

1933 establishments in Spain
1937 disestablishments in Spain
Alfonsism
Catholic political parties
Defunct Christian political parties
Defunct far-right parties
Far-right political parties in Spain
Monarchist parties in Spain
Political parties disestablished in 1937
Political parties established in 1933
Political parties of the Spanish Civil War